Furna railway station is a railway station in the municipality of Jenaz, in the Swiss canton of Grisons. It takes its name from the nearby municipality of Furna. It is an intermediate stop on the Rhaetian Railway  Landquart–Davos Platz line.

Services
The following local and regional trains call at Furna:

 RegioExpress: morning rush-hour only service to Landquart.
 Regio:
 Rush-hour service to Scuol-Tarasp.
 Rush-hour service between Landquart and Davos Platz.

References

External links
 
 

Railway stations in Graubünden
Rhaetian Railway stations